Mohun Bagan Athletic Club is an Indian professional football club based in Kolkata. The club was formed in Kolkata in 1889.

Mohun Bagan have won the National Football League thrice, the I-League twice and are the current defending champions. They are the most successful team in the history of the Federation Cup having won it fourteen times.

Key

 P = Played
 W = Games won
 D = Games drawn
 L = Games lost
 F = Goals for
 A = Goals against
 Pts = Points
 Pos = Final position

 Div 1 = National Football League
 IL = I-League

 R1 = Round 1
 R2 = Round 2
 R3 = Round 3
 R4 = Round 4
 R5 = Round 5
 R6 = Round 6
 Group = Group stage
 R16 = Round of 16
 QF = Quarter-finals
 SF = Semi-finals
 F = Final

Seasons

References

 
Mohun Bagan
Mohun Bagan